The Ventotene Manifesto, officially entitled For a Free and United Europe. A Draft Manifesto (Per un'Europa libera e unita. Progetto d'un manifesto), is a political statement written by Altiero Spinelli while he was imprisoned on the Italian island of Ventotene during World War II.  Completed in June 1941, the Manifesto was circulated within the Italian Resistance, and it soon became the programme of the Movimento Federalista Europeo.  The Manifesto called for a socialist federation of Europe and the world. In the text,  European Federalism and World Federalism are presented as a way to prevent future wars.  Vayssière notes that the manifesto is widely seen as the birth of European federalism. Spinelli (1907–86), a former Communist, became a leader of the federalist movement due to his primary authorship of the Manifesto and his postwar advocacy. The manifesto called for a break with Europe's past to form a new political system through a restructuring of politics and extensive social reform. It was presented not as an ideal, but as the best option for Europe's postwar condition.

Key text
The most important assessment was the assertion that 
"The dividing line between progressive and reactionary parties no longer follows the formal line of greater or lesser democracy, or of more or less socialism to be instituted; rather the division falls along the line, very new and substantial, that separates the party members into two groups. The first is made up of those who conceive the essential purpose and goal of struggle as the ancient one, that is, the conquest of national political power – and who, although involuntarily, play into the hands of reactionary forces, letting the incandescent lava of popular passions set in the old moulds, and thus allowing old absurdities to arise once again. The second are those who see the creation of a solid international State as the main purpose; they will direct popular forces toward this goal, and, having won national power, will use it first and foremost as an instrument for achieving international unity."

This statement was in contrast with the idea, then prevailing, that unity could be achieved almost naturally and only as a secondary goal, after the attainment of political purposes (communism, democracy and so on) in individual countries.

Editions
Il Manifesto di Ventotene / The Ventotene Manifesto, Altiero Spinelli and Ernesto Rossi, preface by Eugenio Colorni. Foreword by Laura Boldrini, introductions by Lucio Levi and Pier Virgilio Dastoli. Editrice Ultima spiaggia, book series "Sand Grains" by Nicola Vallinoto, July 2016. [Bilingual edition Italian and English]

Notes

External links
 The Manifesto of Ventotene (English translation) 

Italian resistance movement

1941 documents

Politics of Italy
Eurofederalism
1941 in Italy
Political manifestos